This is a list of the stations and halts on the Talyllyn Railway, a  narrow gauge preserved railway line running for  from Tywyn on the Mid-Wales coast to Nant Gwernol near the village of Abergynolwyn. The line was opened in 1866 to carry slate from the quarries at Bryn Eglwys to Tywyn, and was the first narrow gauge railway in Britain authorised by Act of Parliament to carry passengers using steam haulage. Despite severe under-investment, the line remained open, and in 1951 it became the first railway in the world to be preserved as a heritage railway by volunteers.

Route
Leaving this station the line passes immediately under the A493 Machynlleth to Dolgellau road and enters a long cutting that climbs towards . From Pendre, the railway climbs up to Ty Mawr bridge and on to Hendy, the first of five minor halts, which serves the adjacent farm. More local halts follow at Fach Goch, and Cynfal, the latter having a small platform. Rhydyronen, now a request stop, was the first intermediate station built on the line, opening in 1867.

The railway continues in a north easterly direction, passing Quarry Siding, where a halt and passing loop are located. The line continues its ascent towards Abergynolwyn station, situated on a ledge cut into the hillside. This was the original terminus of the statutory railway, beyond which the railway continued as a mineral extension, now converted for passenger use. About three quarters of the way along the  extension is the site of the Village Incline. From here the line runs into a gorge, high above the river on a narrow ledge, ending at the foot of the first incline leading to the Bryn Eglwys quarry. Nant Gwernol station, the eastern terminus of the line, was built here on the site of a set of three sidings which originally marked the end of the original line.

List of stations and halts

References

Bibliography

External links

Talyllyn Railway website

 Talyllyn
 
Talyllyn Railway
Railway stations, Talyllyn
Wales transport-related lists